The Deseret Telegraph and Post Office building is one of the oldest buildings in Rockville, Utah, United States. It was built in 1864 by Edward Huber. A small wood frame office addition housed a telegraph office and a post office. The main structure is a two-story red sandstone building with a low second floor. The office is a lean-to addition on the right side of the main building. A similar lean-to on the other side, now missing, matched the office, and there is a two-story gabled frame addition to the rear. There are two rooms in the main block downstairs, and one upstairs.

The Deseret Telegraph and Post Office was placed on the National Register of Historic Places on February 23, 1972. The house has been restored.

See also
 Deseret Telegraph Company

References

External links

 
 Deseret Telegraph and Post Office at the Washington County Historical Society

Post office buildings on the National Register of Historic Places in Utah
Government buildings completed in 1864
Buildings and structures in Washington County, Utah
Historic American Buildings Survey in Utah
National Register of Historic Places in Washington County, Utah